Myoporum stokesii  is a plant in the figwort family, Scrophulariaceae and is endemic to the island of Raivavae in French Polynesia. It is similar to the two other members of its genus on the island, Myoporum rapense and Myoporum rimatarense although the former has serrated leaves and the latter has wider leaves and differently shaped fruits.

Description
The older branches are wrinkled and have raised leaf bases.

The tube is white, sometimes spotted and is hairy inside and on the inner parts of the lobes. There are four stamens which extend beyond the petal tube. The fruits is a three or four-sided, cone-shaped drupe.

Taxonomy
Myoporum stokesii was first formally described in 1935 by Forest B. H. Brown and the description was published in Bernice P. Bishop Museum Bulletin. The specific epithet  stokesii honours the collector of the type specimen, A.M. Stokes.

Distribution and habitat
Myoporum stokesii is only found on Raivavae where it grows on rocky hillsides.

Conservation
Myoporum stokesii is listed as "critically endangered" in the IUCN Red List.

References

Flora of French Polynesia
stokesii
Critically endangered plants
Plants described in 1935
Taxonomy articles created by Polbot
Taxa named by Forest B.H. Brown